Rudy Silbaugh (born September 10, 1930) is a former member of the Wisconsin State Assembly.

Biography
Silbaugh was born on September 10, 1930 in Viroqua, Wisconsin. He is married with three children.

Career
Silbaugh was first elected to the Assembly in 1990. In addition, he was a Stoughton, Wisconsin alderman from 1978 to 1991. He is a Republican. He lost the 1996 Assembly election to Democrat Tom Hebl.

References

People from Viroqua, Wisconsin
People from Stoughton, Wisconsin
Republican Party members of the Wisconsin State Assembly
Wisconsin city council members
1930 births
Living people